H.P. Sullivan was the Secretary of State of California from 1970 to 1971 after Frank M. Jordan died in office.  He was appointed by Gov. Ronald Reagan.

References

Secretaries of State of California
California Republicans
1921 births
1972 deaths